Wimzie's House is a half-hour Canadian preschool television program produced in Montreal which ran as La Maison de Ouimzie on Télévision de Radio-Canada in the morning and Radio-Québec in late afternoons starting March 4, 1995, and in English on CBC Television starting October 21, 1996 and in the United States on Public Broadcasting Service (PBS) from September 1, 1997 to August 31, 2001. Reruns of the show aired in the United States on the Cookie Jar Toons block on This TV, in syndication as part of the Cookie Jar Kids Network block, and on Light TV from December 22, 2016 to September 30, 2019. The series was produced by Cinar (later Cookie Jar Entertainment, now part of WildBrain), with the PBS telecasts presented by Maryland Public Television from 1997 to 2001. The show's puppetry is in the style of Sesame Street, which led to some legal troubles with The Jim Henson Company in 2000 (even though they had some collaboration for some certain children's television shows e.g., Hi Opie!, Dog City, Fraggle Rock, The Hoobs, etc., as well as the same with its production partner, Sesame Workshop, best known for Sesame Park, the Canadian adaptation of Sesame Street). There were two FMV PC games based on the series. Treehouse TV also aired this show in reruns from 1999 to December 2005.

Plot
Wimzie is a little girl monster who lives with her parents (Rousso & Graziella), grandma (Yaya), and baby brother (Bo). The basic plot was that Wimzie's friends would always come over for the day and they would play together. This usually resulted in a problem and two songs that would eventually lead to the moral of the episode. The cast never expanded beyond the eight main characters. There were some friends and neighbors mentioned, but they never made a real physical appearance.

Characters
(Voices listed here are for the American English-language version.)

 Wimzie (performed by Brigitte Brideau and voiced by Sonja Ball) is the protagonist of the series, who is a dragon/bird hybrid with a unique appearance, yellow-orange skin, purple hair tied in pigtails decorated in baby blue bows and red wing-like antlers on the top of her head. She is 5 years old and also introduces each episode in the beginning of the series. In the musical numbers, she performs a few of her solo songs which are titled "When There's a Job to Do", "Turtles", "Be Exactly Who You Are", "Something in My Head" and "I Love You". She has a baby brother named Bo.
 Rousso (performed by Michel P. Ranger and voiced by Tyrone Benskin) is Wimzie's father. He is a calm tail-less dragon with orange skin and blonde hair. He works as a firefighter. When not on the job, Rousso likes to relax. He's a little slow but very kind-hearted. It has been revealed that he has a sister named Alice who is Wimzie's aunt.
 Graziella (performed by Michel Ledoux, assisted by Helen Evans, voiced by Jennifer Seguin) is Wimzie's mother. She is a bird-like monster (as she has arms instead of wings) with pink featherless skin and blonde hair in a beehive hairdo. When not on the job, Graziella will spend time with children, often giving them advice. She works as a pilot and is often away from home for extended periods. She has the same voices as Gertie's Mom from The Little Lulu Show, Mrs. Millicent Crosswire (Muffy's Mom) from Arthur, and Doris from Caillou (as both characters are voiced by the same actress) and has a brother named Mario, Wimzie's uncle, who forgot to send Wimzie a binga-boinga on her 5th birthday.
 Bo (performed by Lucie Beauvais and  voiced by Liz MacRae) is Wimzie's baby brother. Being still a baby, he often gets most of Yaya's attention and the others keep tabs on him as well. Unlike Wimzie, he is a full tail-less dragon and not a hybrid like his big sister. He is still learning to talk, so he mostly communicates in gibberish. He is around the age of 12–18 months.
 Yaya (performed by Johanne Rodrigue, assisted by Grant Mason, voiced by Jane Woods) is Wimzie's 150-year-old maternal grandmother and Graziella's mother. (Like Graziella, she is also a bird-like monster.) She runs a daycare in Wimzie's house for Wimzie and her friends while their parents are working. She has lavender featherless skin and her hair is a stack of orange, blonde and purple. Like Jonas and Loulou, she wears glasses. She occasionally talks to the children (whenever they have a problem) and gives them advice when they need it. Despite her old age, she is full of energy, often being more than a match for a houseful of children, daughter and son-in-law. She also silences everyone during an argument by making a foghorn blowing noise and sound and nobody knows how she does it. She has a bedroom that is only seen in the intro. She has the same voice as Little Lulu Moppet from The Little Lulu Show.
 Jonas (performed by Andre Meunier, assisted by Jim Kroupa, voiced by Thor Bishopric) is a goblin who is 5 years old and loves science. He collects dirt and has a surprisingly large collection. His skin is green with purple hair and he wears eyeglasses and a propeller cap. Often in his explanations, he would include his catch phrase "It's very scientific." Lou Lou is his little sister. Wimzie possibly has a crush on him. He has the same voice as Jordi from The Secret World of Santa Claus.
 Loulou (performed by Sylvie Comtois and voiced by Holly Gauthier-Frankel) is Jonas's 3 and a half-year-old sister (and a goblin like Jonas). She wants to be like the bigger kids. Yet isn't quite ready to make the jump. She is capable of understanding Bo's baby-jabber. Her complexion is yellow-green and she has the same voice as Sagwa from Sagwa the Chinese Siamese Cat. She wears eyeglasses and has purple hair like her brother, tied in a high ponytail decorated in a bow. Her solo songs are titled "When I'm Scared", "I wanna be Big Right Now", "Left Out" and "What's so good about being big?".
 Horace (performed by Richard Lalancette and  voiced by Bruce Dinsmore) is a 4-year-old troll, Horace isn't as smart as the other kids, but is always asking questions and learning things. He is the strongest of all the children, but angers easily and can sometimes be rough. He gets along best with Bo and his big sister Wimzie. He has the same voice as Tubby Tompkins from The Little Lulu Show. His skin is light blue and his hair is orange and very straight. He also has a cousin named Morris who looks a lot like him and they are both voiced by the same actor. A running gag throughout the show shows always saying, "Uh/um...question." and then another character would usually respond by saying, "Yes Horace?".

Episodes

Season 1 (1995)
 The Cookie Crisis (March 4, 1995)
 Boo! (March 5, 1995)
 The Magic Crayon (March 6, 1995)
 I Want My Mommy (March 7, 1995)
 Flower Power (March 8, 1995)
 Babies Have It Made (March 11, 1995)
 The Scaredy Cats (March 12, 1995)
 The Treasure Hunt (March 13, 1995)
 The Boy Who Cried Wolf (March 14, 1995)
 What's the Matter with Horace? (March 15, 1995)
 You're Not My Friend (March 18, 1995)
 To Share or Not To Share (March 19, 1995)
 The Play's the Thing (March 20, 1995)
 The Lucky Pin (March 21, 1995)
 Queen For A Day (March 22, 1995)
 A Fishy Fish Story (March 25, 1995)
 To Tell the Truth (March 26, 1995)
 Jonas, The Actor (March 27, 1995)
 All Alone (March 28, 1995)
 You Just Gotta Keep Trying (March 29, 1995)
 A Medal for Horace (April 1, 1995)
 By the Numbers (April 2, 1995)
 Mad at Dad (April 3, 1995)
 Aahhchoo! (April 4, 1995)
 Wimzie's Hushabye (April 5, 1995)
 The Tattletales (April 8, 1995)
 I Dare You! (April 9, 1995)
 We Want Toys! (April 10, 1995)
 The Personal Trainer (April 11, 1995)
 Jonas and All of His Hits (April 12, 1995)
 Who Do You Trust? (April 15, 1995)
 Jonas' Big Purple Map (April 16, 1995)
 Wimzie's Three Wishes (April 17, 1995)
 Who's The Boss? (April 18, 1995)
 The Great Moving Day (April 19, 1995)
 The Mighty Monster Power Piggies (April 22, 1995)
 Wimzie's Scary Dream (April 23, 1995)
 The Little Red Wimzie (April 24, 1995)
 Friendship Day (April 25, 1995)
 Bye Bye Birdie (April 26, 1995)
 A Little Privacy, Please? (April 29, 1995)
 I'm Scared for Daddy (April 30, 1995)
 Bo Goes Bonkers! (May 1, 1995)
 Identical Cousins (May 2, 1995)
 The Hand-Me-Down Sweater (May 3, 1995)
 I Think I Forgot Something (May 6, 1995)
 Mommy's Afraid (May 7, 1995)
 The Stuke-A-Piddleys (May 8, 1995)
 The Tooth Fairy (May 9, 1995)
 Wimzie's Late (May 10, 1995)
 The Cookie Caper (May 13, 1995)
 Wimzie's Big Trip (May 14, 1995)
 The Lost Bone (May 15, 1995)
 Official Backwards Day (May 16, 1995)
 Doctor Wimzie (May 17, 1995)
 The Assistant Grown-Up (May 20, 1995)

Season 2 (1996) 
 The Sore Winner (June 17, 1996)
 To Each His Own (June 18, 1996)
 The Contest (June 19, 1996)
 Please Don't Say That! (June 20, 1996)
 Be Yourself (June 21, 1996)
 The Boys Against The Girls (June 24, 1996)
 The Storm (June 25, 1996)
 You Have to Learn the Trade (June 26, 1996)
 Substitute Daddy (June 27, 1996)
 Wimzie the Magician (June 28, 1996)
 The Best Hiding Place on Earth (July 1, 1996)
 The Jingle (July 2, 1996)
 Mind Your Manners (July 3, 1996)
 Picking a President (July 4, 1996)
 We Can Do It! (July 5, 1996)
 The Accident (July 8, 1996)
 Happy Birthday, Yaya! (July 9, 1996)
 The Dropsies (July 10, 1996)
 Icky, Yucky and Goofy (July 11, 1996)
 Cinderloulou (July 12, 1996)
 Loulou Thinks Big (July 15, 1996)
 Nicknames (July 16, 1996)
 A Little Bit Testy (July 17, 1996)
 Noises Night and Day (July 18, 1996)
 Motherly Love (July 19, 1996)
 I Don't Like Chores! (July 22, 1996)
 Imagination in Action (July 23, 1996)
 Promises, Promises (July 24, 1996)
 The Telephone Call (July 25, 1996)
 Am I Dreaming? (July 26, 1996)
 What's the Truth? (July 29, 1996)
 Wimzie the Prankster (July 30, 1996)
 My Doll is for Sale (July 31, 1996)
 The Show-Off (August 1, 1996)
 Growing Up is Hard To Do (August 2, 1996)
 From Dirt... to Ice Cream (August 5, 1996)
 Shaggy's Visit (August 6, 1996)
 Wimzie's Rainbow Wig (August 7, 1996)
 Ants in My Pants (August 8, 1996)
 The Silent Treatment (August 9, 1996)
 Daddy's Girl (August 12, 1996)
 Go for the Gold (August 13, 1996)
 Wimzie's Family Career Day (August 14, 1996)
 It's Bedtime! (August 15, 1996)
 The Blackout (August 16, 1996)
 Who Needs Yaya? (August 19, 1996)
 All 'Round the World in a Day (August 20, 1996)
 The Big Dinosaur (August 21, 1996)
 The Gizmo-A-Gig-A-Bopper (August 22, 1996)
 The Surprise That Wasn't (August 23, 1996)
 The Ugly Scary Statue (August 26, 1996)
 Horace Goes Whammer (August 27, 1996)
 Wimzie Sees It All (August 28, 1996)
 Wimzie the Interrupter (August 29, 1996)
 The Magic Starfruit (August 30, 1996)
 The Perfect Christmas (August 31, 1996)

Songs
 Wimzie's House Theme Song (song in at the beginning of every episode)
 Uh-Oh! (sung in "The Cookie Crisis", "The Boys Against the Girls", "What's The Truth?", "The Blackout" and "Horace Goes Whammer")
 Always Tell the Truth (sung in "The Cookie Crisis" and "Ants in My Pants")
 Best of Friends (song in "Boo!" and "The Silent Treatment")
 I Don't Like That (sung in "Boo!", "The Show-Off", "The Silent Treatment", "Horace Goes Whammer" and "Wimzie the Interrupter")
 They Are Mine! (sung in "The Magic Crayon")
 It's Okay to Say What We Feel (sung in "The Magic Crayon" and "Nicknames")
 Time to Relax (song in "I Want My Mommy")
 Pretending (sung in "I Want My Mommy" and "Wimzie's Family Career Day")
 Some Things in Life Just Take Time (sung in "Flower Power")
 Together (sung in "Flower Power")
 I Wish I Were a Baby (sung in "Babies Have It Made")
 I Rather Just Be Me (sung in "Babies Have It Made")
 Frightened in the Night (sung in "The Scaredy Cats")
 Count on Your Friends (sung in "The Scaredy Cats" and "Motherly Love")
 Sometimes There Are Two of Me (sung in "The Treasure Hunt", "The Sore Winner" and "Wimzie Sees It All")
 I Know What I Should Do (sung in "The Treasure Hunt" and "The Big Dinosaur")
 Let's Laugh Together (sung in "The Boy Who Cried Wolf", "Mind Your Manners" and "Wimzie the Prankster")
 Playing Hide and Seek (sung in "The Boy Who Cried Wolf" and "The Best Hiding Place on Earth")
 Why Do We Need Friends? (sung in "What's The Matter with Horace?" and "Am I Dreaming?")
 Even If We Fight (sung in "What's The Matter with Horace?")
 Left Out (sung in "You're Not My Friend" and "Cinderloulou")
 Making Our Friendship Grow (sung in "You're Not My Friend")
 It's My Turn (sung in "To Share or Not to Share")
 If It's Mine (sung in "To Share or Not to Share" and "My Doll is for Sale")
 We Want to Have Fun (sung in "The Play's The Thing")
 Dilemma (sung in "The Play's The Thing")
 I Do Well When I Feel Good (sung in "The Lucky Pin" and "The Show-Off")
 Rousso's Recipe (sung in "The Lucky Pin")
 Sick of Being Sick (sung in "Queen for a Day")
 Sometimes Friends Can Make You Mad (sung in "Queen for a Day")
 Animal Friends (sung in "A Fishy Fish Story" and "Shaggy's Visit")
 Goldfish Goldfish (sung in "A Fishy Fish Story")
 Love Makes Life Worth Living (sung in "To Tell the Truth")
 True or False (sung in "To Tell the Truth" and "What's the Truth?")
 When It Hurts (sung in "Jonas, The Actor" and "I Think I Forgot Something")
 Sometimes Everyone Feels Afraid (sung in "Jonas, The Actor")
 All Alone (sung in "All Alone")
 Number 1 (sung in "All Alone")
 Try Try Try Again (sung in "You Just Gotta Keep Trying" and "We Can Do It!")
 Practice Makes Perfect (sung in "You Just Gotta Keep Trying")
 Forgetting is Okay (sung in "A Medal for Horace" and "Wimzie the Prankster")
 The Things You Miss (sung in "A Medal for Horace")
 One Two Three (sung in "By the Numbers")
 There's Only One Me (sung in "By the Numbers")
 Lullaby for Bo (sung in "Mad at Dad" and "It's Bedtime!")
 That Makes Me Mad! (sung in "Mad at Dad")
 Darn These Allergies (sung in "AAHCHOO!")
 Things That I Don't See (sung in "AAHCHOO!")
 I Have a Secret (sung in "Wimzie's Hushabye" and "Shaggy's Visit")
 When I Have a Friend (sung in "Wimzie's Hushabye" and "To Each His Own")
 The One Color Crayon Blues (sung in "The Tattletales")
 Tattletale (sung in "The Tattletales" and "The Surprise That...Wasn't")
 Green Grape Funk (sung in "I Dare You!")
 Don't You Dare (sung in "I Dare You!")
 Everybody Must Have Toys (sung in "We Want Toys!" and "Imagination in Action")
 There Are Way to Say I Love You (sung in "We Want Toys!", "Motherly Love" and "The Telephone Call")
 You Gotta Get Physical (sung in "The Personal Trainer" and "The Big Dinosaur")
 Healthy Habits (sung in "The Personal Trainer" and "Loulou Thinks Big")
 Hands Are Not Made for a Fight (sung in "Jonas and All of His Hits")
 Timeouts (sung in "Jonas and All of His Hits", "Be Yourself" and "Wimzie the Interrupter")
 On TV! On TV! (sung in "Who Do You Trust?")
 Not Too Much TV (sung in "Who Do You Trust?" and "The Blackout")
 I Love My Dirt (sung in "Jonas' Big Purple Map" and "From Dirt...to Ice Cream")
 Permission First (sung in "Jonas' Big Purple Map", "The Telephone Call" and "Wimzie's Rainbow Wig")
 The Wishing Song (sung in "Wimzie's Three Wishes" and "Wimzie Sees it All")
 Families and Friends (sung in "Wimzie's Three Wishes" and "Am I Dreaming?")
 I Was Born to Lead (sung in "Who's the Boss?")
 Life Is Simply Grand (sung in "Who's the Boss?")
 When I Miss Someone I Love (sung in "The Great Moving Day")
 To Help a Friend (sung in "The Great Moving Day", "Substitute Daddy" and "The Gizmo-A-Gig-A-Bopper")
 The Mighty Monster Power Piggies (sung in "The Mighty Monster Power Piggies")
 Find Your Own Dream (sung in "The Mighty Monster Power Piggies", "Picking A President" and "I Don't Like Chores")
 The Monster Mask (sung in "Wimzie's Scary Dream")
 I Like to Dream (sung in "Wimzie's Scary Dream")
 On Lazy Days (sung in "The Little Red Wimzie")
 When There's a Job to Do (sung in "The Little Red Wimzie", and "I Don't Like Chores!")
 Are You My Friend? (sung in "Friendship Day")
 Even If We're Friends (sung in "Friendship Day" and "The Contest")
 It's Okay to Cry (sung in "Bye Bye Birdie" and "Promises, Promises")
 We All Need Taking Care Of (sung in "Bye Bye Birdie")
 Yaya's Diary (sung in "A Little Privacy, Please?" and "Who Needs Yaya?")
 Tape Recorder Rap (sung in "A Little Privacy, Please?" and "All 'Round the World in a Day")
 Turtles (sung in "I'm Scared for Daddy" and "Go for the Gold")
 I'm a Fireman (sung in "I'm Scared for Daddy" and "Promises, Promises")
 Where is Bo? (sung in "Bo Goes Bonkers!" and "The Ugly Scary Statue")
 Taking a Nap (sung in "Bo Goes Bonkers!")
 Stand Up and Speak Out (sung in "Identical Cousins")
 I Like to Be Me (sung in "Identical Cousins")
 Brand New Again (sung in "The Hand-Me-Down Sweater" and "The Gizmo-A-Gig-A-Bopper")
 What Makes Something Special (sung in "The Hand-Me-Down Sweater", "You Have to Learn the Trade" and "My Doll is for Sale")
 Me and My Dad (sung in "I Think I Forgot Something" and "Wimzie the Magician")
 Feeling Afraid (sung in "Mommy's Afraid")
 Sometimes I'm Scared (sung in "Mommy's Afraid", "The Storm", "Growing Up is Hard To Do" and "Ants in My Pants")
 Invisible Me (sung in "The Stuke-A-Piddleys" and "The Dropsies")
 The Words You Say (sung in "The Stuke-A-Piddleys" and "All 'Round the World in a Day")
 That's the Rule (sung in "The Tooth Fairy" and "Please Don't Say That!")
 Stay Awake (sung in "The Tooth Fairy" and "It's Bedtime!")
 Tick Tock Clock (sung in "Wimzie's Late")
 Right on Time (sung in "Wimzie's Late")
 Snacktime is Fun (sung in "The Cookie Caper", "The Jingle" and "The Surprise That... Wasn't")
 Privacy (sung in "The Cookie Caper")
 It's Fun to Go Travelling (sung in "Wimzie's Big Trip" and "Who Needs Yaya?")
 Disappointment (sung in "Wimzie's Big Trip" and "The Perfect Christmas")
 Digging in the Dirt (sung in "The Lost Bone")
 Bones (sung in "The Lost Bone" and "The Accident")
 Let's Be Different (sung in "Official Backwards Day")
 The Searching Song (sung in "Official Backwards Day", "Happy Birthday, Yaya!" and "Go for the Gold")
 I'm Taking Care of Mommy (sung in "Doctor Wimzie")
 Yaya's Good Tummy Soup (sung in "Doctor Wimzie")
 It's Fun to Be Detectives (sung in "The Assistant Grown-Up")
 Responsibility (sung in "The Assistant Grown-Up")
 I Won (sung in "The Sore Winner" and "A Little Bit Testy")
 I Like Painting Pictures (sung in "To Each His Own")
 Playing Dress Up is Such Fun (sung in "The Contest", "Wimzie's Rainbow Wig" and "Wimzie's Family Career Day")
 Watch Your Words (sung in "Please Don't Say That!" and "Icky, Yucky and Goofy")
 Shhhhh (sung in "Be Yourself" and "Noises Night and Day")
 Boys and Girls (sung in "The Boys Against the Girls" and "Daddy's Girl")
 Scary Noises (sung in "The Storm")
 Find a Better Way (sung in "You Have to Learn the Trade")
 Our Dad (sung in "Substitute Daddy" and "Daddy's Girl")
 Magic! (sung in "Wimzie the Magician" and "The Magic Starfruit")
 Do the Right Thing! (sung in "The Best Hiding Place on Earth")
 Trying to Figure Problems Out (sung in "The Jingle")
 Good Manners (sung in "Mind Your Manners")
 Presidents (sung in "Picking a President")
 No Problem! (sung in "We Can Do It!")
 Brothers and Sisters (sung in "The Accident")
 Imagination (sung in "Happy Birthday, Yaya!")
 Better Be Careful! (sung in "The Dropsies", "Imagination in Action" and "The Ugly Scary Statue")
 I'm Special (sung in "Icky, Yucky and Goofy" and "The Magic Starfruit")
 What's So Good About Being Tall? (sung in "Cinderloulou")
 I Wanna Be Big Right Now (sung in "Loulou Thinks Big" and "Growing Up is Hard to Do")
 The Nicknames (sung in "Nicknames")
 We All Need Each Other (sung in "A Little Bit Testy" and "From Dirt to... Ice Cream")
 Noisy Noises (sung in "Noises Night and Day")
 I Love Snow (sung in "The Perfect Christmas")

Legal troubles
In 2000, The Jim Henson Company issued a lawsuit against the company, claiming the series' puppets and resultant merchandise violated its copyright and trademark rights on The Muppets. CINAR and its licensees Eden LLC and Carson-Dellosa Publishing Company denied and continue to deny any wrongdoing or liability for infringement.

A confidential settlement allowed CINAR to continue broadcasting the series, selling show merchandise, and a "mechanism for preserving the distinctive look of Jim Henson's Muppets in CINAR's future productions."

Ronald A. Weinberg, CINAR President and Co-CEO:

Media

Video releases
Five hour-long VHS tapes were released by Sony Wonder in 1999 to 2000.
It's Magic Time! (August 10, 1999)
You're Special (August 10, 1999)
Pet Tales (March 7, 2000)
Babies Have It Made (March 7, 2000)
Happy Holidays (September 12, 2000)

DVD releases
On July 27, 2010, Mill Creek Entertainment released a 10 episode Best-of collection entitled Wimzie's House: A World of Enchantment on DVD in Region 1.

See also
 Allegra's Window
 Barney & Friends
 Groundling Marsh
 Kidsongs
 Nanalan'
 The Puzzle Place
 Sesame Park
 Sesame Street
 Tweenies
 Wishbone
 Zoboomafoo
 Theodore Tugboat
 Eureeka's Castle
Gullah Gullah Island
The Wiggles

References

External links
 TV.com page
 

1990s Canadian children's television series
1990s Canadian comedy television series
1990s Canadian music television series
1995 Canadian television series debuts
1996 Canadian television series endings
1990s preschool education television series
Canadian children's comedy television series
Canadian children's fantasy television series
Canadian children's musical television series
Canadian preschool education television series
Canadian television shows featuring puppetry
Personal development television series
Television shows adapted into plays
Television shows adapted into video games
English-language television shows
PBS original programming
PBS Kids shows
Treehouse TV original programming
CBC Television original programming
Ici Radio-Canada Télé original programming
Television series about monsters
Television series about birds
Television series about dragons
Television series about children
Television series about siblings
Television series about families
Works about friendship
Fictional houses
Television shows set in Montreal
Television shows set in Quebec
Television shows filmed in Montreal
Television series set in the 1990s
Television series by Cookie Jar Entertainment